Posthumous is a five track EP from the American hardcore punk/metalcore band, The Banner.  Originally recorded as the band's first (and unnamed) demo (while the band was still known by their original moniker, Bruce Banner), it was handed at out the band's local shows to fans and attendees.  As a result of the popular demo tape, the band won a contract with local New Jersey punk specialist label, Blackout! Records. The demo was then renamed "Posthumous" and re-released as a CD-EP.  It was the first of two recordings the band released with Blackout! before leaving for Ferret Music. It was released in June, 2003.

Overview
Debate continues over what genre this band fits into and this EP was probably where it all started. The opening track, "Outgunned", has metal qualities – including Slayer-like riff flourishes, but the vocal style throughout is undeniably hardcore punk.

"Rattlesnakes", "The Screaming", and "Marked For Life", on the other hand are more in the straightforward hardcore punk mould, especially influenced by the New York hardcore subgenre. Fast-paced songs with trademark refrains – commonly referred to as breakdowns. While "The Screaming" does contain a small amount of metal influence, "Marked For Life" is probably more comparable to an early Black Flag track. The EP's closing track, "Trial By Fire", brings all these influences together to form a song which is, in the early part, quite technical metal. It has a mellow, Bane-like interlude in the middle which then breaks out into a typical hardcore punk, complete with background gang chants.  Despite the credits, founding members Jon Morozowski (bass) and Paul Jafre (drums) played on this recording.

Track listing
All songs written by The Banner
"Outgunned"	–	4:28
"Rattlesnakes"	–	2:27
"The Screaming"	–	2:46
"Marked For Life"	–	2:28
"Trial By Fire"	–	4:01

Credits
 Joey – vocals
 Garrett – guitar
 Chris – guitar
 Fingerz – bass
 Ian – drums

External links
The Banner Official Website (Archive) 2003-08-04 (original website now the subject of domain parking)
Blackout Records band page (Archive) 2006-10-15 (original link now redirects to Blackout Records blog)
Ferret Music band page

The Banner (band) albums
2003 EPs